Eugene Harry Rose (July 11, 1904 – February 1, 1979) was a player in the National Football League (NFL) for the Chicago Cardinals from 1929 to 1932. He played college football at the University of Wisconsin–Madison.

Biography
Rose was on July 11, 1904 in Racine, Wisconsin.

References

1904 births
1979 deaths
American football halfbacks
Chicago Cardinals players
Wisconsin Badgers football players
Sportspeople from the Milwaukee metropolitan area
Sportspeople from Racine, Wisconsin
Players of American football from Wisconsin